Marcin Szymański (born 1 July 1972 in Poland) is a Polish retired footballer who is last known to have played for Galway United in the Republic of Ireland.

Career
Szymanski started his senior career with Śląsk Wrocław in 1992. He made one hundred and ninety-three appearances and scored two goals. After that, he played for Polish club Górnik Polkowice, Irish clubs Salthull Devon and Galway United before retiring in 2005.

References

External links 
 Kocham Cię jak Irlandię 
 Polish Wikipedia Page 
 90minut Profile

1972 births
Living people
Polish footballers
Association football defenders
Expatriate association footballers in the Republic of Ireland
Galway United F.C. players
Salthill Devon F.C. players
Polish expatriate footballers
Śląsk Wrocław players
Górnik Polkowice players